Geneva Creek may refer to:

Geneva Creek (Colorado)
Geneva Creek (Texas), Texas